In Greek mythology, Ascalaphus or Askalaphus (Ancient Greek: Ἀσκάλαφος Askalaphos), was son of Ares and the Minyan princess Astyoche, daughter of King Actor of Orchomenus. Ascalaphus (sometimes Askalaphus) was also a king of the Minyans, and twin brother of Ialmenos. These brothers were counted among the Argonauts and the suitors of Helen, and led the Orchomenian contingent in the Trojan War, where Deiphobos threw a spear and killed him.

Notes

References 

Apollodorus, The Library with an English Translation by Sir James George Frazer, F.B.A., F.R.S. in 2 Volumes, Cambridge, MA, Harvard University Press; London, William Heinemann Ltd. 1921. . Online version at the Perseus Digital Library. Greek text available from the same website.
Gaius Julius Hyginus, Fabulae from The Myths of Hyginus translated and edited by Mary Grant. University of Kansas Publications in Humanistic Studies. Online version at the Topos Text Project.
Homer, The Iliad with an English Translation by A.T. Murray, Ph.D. in two volumes. Cambridge, MA., Harvard University Press; London, William Heinemann, Ltd. 1924. Online version at the Perseus Digital Library.
Tzetzes, John, Allegories of the Iliad translated by Goldwyn, Adam J. and Kokkini, Dimitra. Dumbarton Oaks Medieval Library, Harvard University Press, 2015. 

Kings of Minyan Orchomenus
Kings in Greek mythology
Argonauts
Suitors of Helen
Achaean Leaders
Children of Ares
Demigods in classical mythology
Minyan characters in Greek mythology